The Kofi Annan Foundation is an independent, not-for profit organization that works to promote better global governance and strengthen the capacities of people and countries to achieve a fairer, more peaceful world. It was founded and legally incorporated in Switzerland in 2007 by Kofi Annan, former secretary general of the United Nations.

Kofi Annan believes that "there can be no long-term development without security and no long-term security without development. Nor will any society remain prosperous for long without the rule of law and respect for human rights". Accordingly, the Foundation believes that fair and peaceful societies rest on three pillars: Peace and Security, Sustainable Development and Human Rights and the Rule of Law, and they have made it their mission to mobilise the leadership and the political resolve needed to tackle threats to these three pillars ranging from violent conflict to flawed elections and climate change, with the aim of achieving a fairer, more peaceful world. The Foundation provides the communication and co-ordination capacities needed to ensure that these objectives are achieved. Moreover, the Foundation provides the analytical and logistical support to facilitate Kofi Annan's contribution to peace worldwide.

Board members
The Foundation has 11 board members:

 Elhadj As Sy, Secretary General of the International Federation of Red Cross and Red Crescent Societies (IFRC)
 Nane Annan, Nutrition advocate, artist, and former lawyer.
 Louise Arbour, Canadian lawyer, prosecutor and jurist. Former Special Representative of the United Nations Secretary-General for International Migration.
 Doris Leuthard, Swiss politician and lawyer, and was a member of the Swiss Federal Council between 2006 and 2018. 
 Graça Machel, International advocate for women’s and children’s rights; former freedom fighter and first Education Minister of Mozambique.
 Bernard Mensah, Bank of America President of the UK and Central Eastern Europe, the Middle East and Africa (CEEMEA) and co-head of Global Fixed Income, Currencies and Commodities (FICC) Trading.
 Michael Møller, former under-secretary-general of the United Nations and the 12th director-general of the United Nations Office at Geneva.
 Ghassan Salamé, Lebanese academic, politician and diplomat.
 Samson Itodo, Samson is a lawyer from Nigeria and Founder of Yiaga Africa, an NGO whose mission is to promote democracy in Africa.
 Kyung-wha Kang, A former Minister of Foreign Affairs for the Republic of Korea, Ms Kang was previously United Nations Deputy Emergency Relief Coordinator and Deputy High Commissioner for Human Rights.
 Ivan Pictet, Former Senior Partner of Swiss multinational private bank Pictet & Cie and former President of Fondation pour Genève.

Principles
The foundation presses for peaceful and equitable solutions to critical global issues through mediation, political mentoring, advocacy and advice. The unique experience and reach of Kofi Annan enable the foundation to mobilise support from across the worlds of diplomacy, business, politics and civil society. Indeed, the foundation works along 4 principles:

 Private diplomacy: Kofi Annan provides informal counsel and participates in discreet diplomatic initiatives to avert or resolve crises; 
 Public advocacy: Through public engagements, speeches, conferences, media interviews, and statements, Kofi Annan shapes public discussion of global issues and threats; 
 Convening power: Led by Kofi Annan, the Foundation brings together leaders in diplomacy, business, politics and development to analyse and respond to key policy issues; and 
 Analysis: The Foundation develops evidence-based analysis based on research and high level consultation.

Activities
Kofi Annan was often asked to intercede in crises, sometimes as an impartial independent mediator, sometimes as a special envoy of the international community. In his later years he provided such counsel to Burkina Faso, Kenya, Myanmar, Senegal, Syria/Iraq and Columbia. He also participated in problem-solving missions for The Elders and other organisations of which he iwas part.

The Foundation provides policy support based on thematic and country monitoring and analysis, and through an informal network of national leaders, multilateral organisations, business leaders, international NGOs, and civil society activists, including women’s groups and faith organisations. The Foundation collaborates in this area with the Centre for Humanitarian Dialogue, the International Crisis Group, the International Centre for Transitional Justice, and Interpeace, among other partners.

Supporting democracy & elections with integrity

The Foundation advises countries on how to strengthen the integrity and legitimacy of their electoral processes and avoid elections related violence. This builds on the work of the Global Commission on Elections, Democracy and Security, a commission jointly created by the Kofi Annan Foundation and the International Institute for Democracy and Electoral Assistance (International IDEA) which aims to highlight the importance of the integrity of elections to achieving a more secure, prosperous and stable world. Indeed, Kofi Annan is quoted as saying that "uncontrolled, unregulated and opaque political finance has also compromised the equal opportunities of citizens to influence political outcomes, leading to voter apathy and distrust. In many countries, elections continue to be associated with a ‘winner-takes-all’ approach, fuelling the potential for conflict and violence. At the same time, elections have been used to perpetuate the rule of dictators by giving a veneer of democratic legitimacy to autocratic regimes" and these concerns are what led him to convene a group of experts and distinguished former leaders to explore how to promote and protect the integrity of elections".

In 2012, the Commission launched its report entitled Deepening Democracy: a Strategy for Improving the Integrity of Elections Worldwide which addresses challenges to electoral integrity and distills recommendations to governments, regional and international organisations, electoral management bodies and civil society to enhance the integrity of electoral processes. In the foreword to the report, Kofi Annan is quoted as saying that "elections are the indispensable root of democracy. They are now almost universal. Since 2000, all but 11 countries have held national elections. But to be credible, we need to see high standards before, during and after votes are cast".

In 2015, Kofi Annan said that "supporting the integrity of elections in Africa and elsewhere will be an area, like all these challenges, I and my Foundation sees as particular priorities this year".

Combatting hunger 
The Foundation promotes reforms in Africa in order to enable the continent to tap into the vast resources and fertile lands available. In this way, the Foundation brings together leaders from the private sector, civil society and the political sphere and advocates for their cooperation to strengthen African agriculture and food systems, and support the continent’s small-holder farmers.

Shortly after the African Union’s Summit in Malabo, which saw bold commitments to end hunger by 2025, through accelerating agricultural growth and transformation, the Foundation – with the support from the Bill & Melinda Gates Foundation – hosted a high-level session with leaders from the public and private sector at the African Green Revolution Forum 2014 to discuss strategies to make this happen. This gathering led to the report, “Scaling-up Investment in African Agriculture and Food Systems”, which makes clear that urgent action is needed on some fundamental areas if Africa is to reach its agricultural potential.

The Foundation explains that "smallholder farmers, who usually cultivate less than two hectares of land, account for the vast majority of farms worldwide, and especially in Africa. With adequate technology, financial resources and market access, they can be at the heart of a green revolution transforming Africa from a food importer to a continent that can feed itself and export to other parts of the world".

Addressing drugs
In West Africa, civil wars have receded and democracy has gained ground. However, international drug cartels are undermining countries and communities, and devastating lives. After looking at the evidence, the Kofi Annan Foundation, in consultation with international and regional partners, national governments and civil society organizations, consulted experts in order to develop effective strategies for tackling the growing threat to Africa from increased drug trafficking and consumption. Today, the Foundation advocates for countries and organisations to implement these strategies in West Africa and beyond through the West Africa Commission on Drugs, launched in June 2014. The commission released their report “Not Just in Transit: Drugs, the State and Society in West Africa”.

As part of this strategy, the West Africa Civil Society Institute (WACSI), the International Drug Policy Consortium (IDPC) and the WACD – in partnership with the Open Society Initiative for West Africa, the Kofi Annan Foundation and USAID – have organized a civil society workshop on drug policy in 2015, in Accra.

Promoting youth leadership

The Kofi Annan said that "young people today are truly citizens of the world. Whatever they are working on, whatever their ambitions for the years ahead, they have to think globally – even when they act locally. Sadly, young people are often overlooked during discussions and decision-making at the national and international level. They have the power to make choices, step forward and take a role in leadership and advocacy. We must listen to the future leaders of the world and empower them to bring about real and necessary change".

One of the Foundation's main focus is fostering dialogue and leadership amongst young people by offering a platform for their ideas and proposed solutions to major public issues. Kofi Annan has been a long time supporter of One Young World, an organisation that provides opportunities for young adults to join in a global network of socially committed people with leadership potential, and was a Counsellor at the inaugural Summit in 2010 and in 2012 in Pittsburgh. In 2013, the Kofi Annan Foundation launched a series of dialogues with youth from the four corners of the world called The Kofi Annan Dialogues: LIVE, on the topics of young people, leadership, unemployment, democracy and elections, and young peoples’ priorities for the post 2015 development agenda.

Building lasting peace
The Kofi Annan Foundation and the International Center for Transitional Justice (ICTJ) launched a joint initiative to take a critical look at the inclusion of truth commissions in peace agreements and their potential to help consolidate post-conflict reconciliation, respect for the rule of law, and stronger protection of human rights. The resulting report “Challenging the Conventional: Can Truth Commissions Strengthen Peace Processes?" presents a set of ideas on a number of critical issues that peace mediators and transitional justice practitioners should take into account when considering a truth-seeking mechanism as part of a peace process. The Foundation recognizes that “truth commissions can have catalytic effects in peace processes so long as they are truly independent, legitimate and recognize the victim’s right to know the truth".

Funding

The Kofi Annan Foundation is an independent not-for-profit foundation funded by a mix of public and private donors. The Foundation takes particular care to ensure that funding sources are beyond reproach and that contributions are politically untied.

References

Foundations based in Switzerland
International organisations based in Switzerland
Organizations established in 2007
2007 establishments in Switzerland